Sandy Rodriguez was born in 1975 in National City, California. She is a Los Angeles based artist who grew up on the US-Mexico border, in Tijuana, San Diego, and Los Angeles. She has exhibited her works with numerous museums and galleries, including the Denver Art Museum, The Huntington Library, Art Museum and Botanical Garden, the Amon Carter Museum of American Art, Los Angeles County Museum of Art, Museum of Contemporary Art San Diego, MOCA Busan Busan Bienniale, Crystal Bridges Museum of American Art, The Cheech Marin Center for Chicano Art, Art+Practice, and Self Help Graphics. Her work focuses on the ongoing cycles of violence on communities of color by blending historical and recent events in the Los Angeles area and along south-west US-Mexico border. A transitional moment for Rodriguez happened in 2014 on a visit to Oaxaca, a southern Mexican Region, where she first procured a red pigment called cochineal, coming from the pre-Columbian era. Prior to this, Rodriguez had painted exclusively in modern paint. The encounter with cochineal happened at the same time she was painting fire paintings and the protests began in Ayotzinapa Mexico in response to forty-three missing college students, which included setting fire to palacio nacional and an Enrique Peña Nieto effigy pinata. The alignment of content, form, and the materials magnified how material can signal cultural identity, history, and politics. A goal of her work is to disrupt dominant narratives and interrogate systems that are ongoing expressions of colonial violence witnessed regularly, including Customs Border Enforcement, Police, and Climate Change.

Education 
Rodriguez earned her Bachelor in Fine Arts from the California Institute of Arts.

Codex Rodriguez-Mondragón (2017 - on-going) 
The artist explains:

"The Codex Rodríguez–Mondragón (2017- ) is a collection of maps and specimen paintings about the ongoing cycles of violence on communities of color by blending historical and recent events. It incorporates hand-processed earth, plant, and insect based watercolor onto the sacred (and once outlawed) amate paper, reclaiming and reaffirming the Indigenous artistic traditions of the Americas. The use of plant materials is significant not only for situating the work within specific floristic provinces but also for their medicinal and healing properties. This makes my maps not simply a representation of the place but objects that serve as an active embodiment of their constituent parts. In my work, a multitude of records, documents, maps and natural materials serve to inform my interpretation of space where various histories are combined, juxtaposed, recovered, and re-envisioned, painted as a codex, a macro and micro view of humanity in relationship with land, time, and power. One of my personal goals is to disrupt western European dominant narratives and challenge audiences with paintings that interrogate legacies of colonial aggression in our daily lives.

My investigation into Indigenous color use in the Americas led me to research the 16th-century Florentine Codex and the history of image- and color-making in colonial Mexico. The Florentine Codex is a twelve-volume encyclopedia compiled by Fray Bernadino de Sahagun and several Indigenous writers and artists, known in Nahuatl as tlacuilos. Working during the middle of the 16th century, they created a compendium of “the things of New Spain,” with parallel Spanish and Nahuatl texts describing deities, plants, animals, and the history of the Spanish invasion in 1519-21. Over 2,000 images accompany these texts, providing a third layer of information.

It is important to mention that the Florentine Codex was created under a colonial regime at a time when their world was changing radically and, in part, under quarantine during the time of a pandemic that wiped out 90 percent of the population."

Museum exhibitions 

2023

Sandy Rodriguez - Unfolding Histories: 200 Years of Resistance [solo exhibition], AD&A Museum, UC-Santa Barbara, CA

Visualizing Place — Maps from The Bancroft Library, The Bancroft Library Gallery, University of California-Berkeley, CA

Day Jobs, Blanton Museum of Art, University of Texas-Austin, TX

To Translate the Unfathomable [solo exhibition], Rutgers Center for Women in the Arts and Humanities, NJ

Borderlands, pt. 2, The Huntington Library, Art Museum, and Botanical Gardens, San Marino, CA

2022

Traitor, Survivor, Icon: The Legacy of La Malinche and the Conquest of Mexico, San Antonio Museum of Art, San Antonio, TX

Contemporary Ex-Voto: Devotion Beyond Medium, New Mexico State University, Art Museum, NM

Past/Present/Future: Expanding Indigenous American, Latinx, Hispanic American, Asian American, and Pacific Islander Perspectives in Thomas J. Watson Library, The Met Fifth Avenue, New York, NY

Busan Biennale: We, on the Rising Wave, Museum of Contemporary Art Busan, Republic of Korea

Traitor, Survivor, Icon: The Legacy of La Malinche and the Conquest of Mexico, Albuquerque Museum, Albuquerque, NM

Traitor, Survivor, Icon: The Legacy of La Malinche and the  Conquest of Mexico, Denver Art Museum, Denver, CO

2021

Sandy Rodriguez - In Isolation [solo exhibition], Amon Carter Museum of American Art, Fort Worth, TX

Mixpantli: Contemporary Echoes, Los Angeles County Museum of Art, Los Angeles, CA

Borderlands, The Huntington Library, Art Museum, and Botanical Gardens, San Marino, CA

Estamos Bien - La Trienal 20/21, El Museo, New York, NY

Re:Visión Art in the Americas, Denver Art Museum, Denver, CO

Joshua Tree Highlands Artist Residency 15th Anniversary Exhibition, San Bernardino County Museum, CA

2019

Mexicali Biennial: Calafia — Manifesting the Terrestrial Paradise, Armory Center for the Arts, Pasadena, CA

2018

Sandy Rodriguez: Codex Rodríguez-Mondragón [solo exhibition], Riverside Art Museum, Riverside, CA

Selected Solo or two-person gallery exhibitions 
2020, You Will Not Be Forgotten, Charlie James Gallery, Los Angeles, CA

2018, Rodriguez/Valadez with John Valadez, East 26 Projects, Vernon, CA

Collections 
Her works are held in the permanent collections of Los Angeles County Museum of Art, Los Angeles, CA; Crystal Bridges Museum of American Art, Bentonville, AR; Amon Carter Museum, Fort Worth, TX; Cheech Marin's collection of Chicano art housed at The Cheech Marin Center for Chicano Art, Culture & Industry in Riverside, California; private and other collections.

Awards and honors 
2023, Jacob Lawrence Award, American Academy of Arts and Letters, New 

York, NY

2023, Hermitage Greenfield Prize, Hermitage Art Retreat, Florida 

2022, Mapping the Early Modern World, an NEH summer institute, Newberry Library, Chicago, IL [withdrew]

2021, Migrations initiative, Mellon Foundation Just Futures Initiative and Global Cornell 

2021, Creative Capital Award 2021-2024 

2020, Caltech-Huntington Art + Research Residency, California Institute of Technology (Caltech) and The Huntington Library, Art Museum, and Botanical Gardens, Los Angeles, CA 

2020, Alma Ruiz Artist Fellowship, Joshua Tree Highlands Artist Residency, Joshua Tree, CA 

2019, City of Los Angeles (COLA) Master Artist Fellow, Department of Cultural Affairs, Los Angeles, CA 

2018, National Recognition to the Best in Public Art Projects Annually, Public Art Network Year in Review, American for the Arts, New York, NY 

2017, Trailblazer Award, Department of Cultural Affairs, City of Los Angeles, CA

2017, Artist-in-Residence, Los Angeles County Arts Commission’s Civic Art 

2016, Program, Martin Luther King Jr. Community Hospital, Recuperative Care Center (RCC), Los Angeles, CA

2014-2015, Artist-in-Residence, Art+Practice, Los Angeles, CA

Publications, including exhibition catalogs 
Rodriguez, Sandy, and Laura Ortman. “Where Process Meets Sensorium”. New Suns 4 (2022).

Lyall, Victoria I., and Terezita Romo, eds. Traitor, Survivor, Icon: The Legacy of La Malinche and the Conquest of Mexico. [Exhibition catalog]. New Haven and London: Yale University Press, 2021.

Lyall, Victoria I., and Jorge F. Rivas , eds. ReVisión: A new look at Art in the Americas [in conjunction with exhibition]. Munich: Hirmer, 2021.

Magaloni Kerpel, Diana. COLA 2019 Individual Artist Fellowships. [Exhibition catalog]. Los Angeles, 2019: 68-73.

Rodriguez, Sandy; texts by Diana Magaloni Kerpel and Anuradha Vikram. Sandy Rodriguez: You Will Not Be Forgotten. [Exhibition catalog]. Los Angeles, 2019.

Wingate, Timothy, ed.; texts by Ananda Cohen-Aponte, Ella Maria Diaz, Charlene Villaseñor Black, and Adolfo Guzman-Lopez. Sandy Rodriguez: Codex Rodriguez-Mondragón. [Exhibition catalog]. Riverside, CA: Riverside Art Museum, 2018.

Rodriguez, Sandy. “Artist’s Communiqué: Keeping the Home Fires Burning”. Aztlán: A Journal of Chicano Studies. (Fall 2017) 42 (2): 287-300.

Rodriguez, Sandy and Isabelle Lutterodt. “Studio75: A Place We Call Home: East of La Cienega and South of Stocker”. Los Angeles County Arts Commission, Some Place Chronicles, Los Angeles, CA.

Select recent bibliography 
2023

Reynosa, Tatiana. Reclaiming the Americas: Latinx Art and the Politics of Territory. Austin: University of Texas Press, forthcoming.

2022

Leibsohn, Dana. "Foreword". Colonial Latin American Review 31.4 (December 2022): 475-78.

Hsu, Husan. L, & Vázquez, David. J. “The Materials of Art and the Legacies of Colonization: A Conversation with Beatrice Glow and Sandy Rodriguez”. Journal of Transnational American Studies (2022) 13.1.

Diaz, Ella Maria. “Exhibition review: Traitor, survivor, icon: The legacy of La Malinche”. Latino Studies (November 2022).

Martin, Deborah. “Things to know about 'The Legacy of Malinche," the San Antonio Museum of Art's big fall exhibit”. San Antonio Express News. October 12, 2022.

Stromberg, Matt. “A new dawn: the Huntington makes progress”. Apollo. July/August 2022.

Miranda, Carolina A. “She’s been branded a traitor. A new exhibition says Mexican icon Malinche was anything but”. Los Angeles Times. May 3, 2022.

Escalante-De Mattei, Shanti. “LACMA Exhibits Subvert the Totalizing Myths of Colonial Conquest”. ARTNews. February 18, 2022.

Loic, Erika.  “The Once and Future Histories of the Book: Decolonial Interventions into the Codex, Chronicle, and Khipu”. Latin American and Latinx Visual Culture 4.1 (2022): 9-26.

Green, Tyler. “Interview: Sandy Rodriguez, In American Waters”. Modern Art Notes podcast.  Jan 13, 2022. Episode 532.

2021

Knight, Christopher. “Review: The conquered rather than the conquerors are given the stage in LACMA’s two new ‘Mixpantli’ exhibits”. Los Angeles Times. Dec 28, 2021.

"Sandy Rodriguez Unveils new pandemic-inspired works on paper in exhibition at the Amon Carter Museum of American Art”. Artdaily. December 18, 2021.  

Mitter, Siddartha. “Seeking Art That Expands the Possibilities for a Troubled World”. Fall Preview, New York Times. Sept 14, 2021.

Longazel, Jaimie and Miranda Cady Hallett, eds. Mortality: Social Death, Dispossession, and Survival in the Americas. Philadelphia: Temple University Press, 2021.

Hubber, Laura. “Sandy Rodriguez: When art, geography and politics collide”. BBC World Service. October 2021.

2020

Travers, Julia. “You Will Not Be Forgotten: Artist Sandy Rodriguez Calls Us to Witness and Act”. IMM-PRINT. May 4, 2020.

Miranda, Carolina A. “Experimentation. Reflection. Wild ensembles. Photos show 5 L.A. artists working under quarantine”. Los Angeles Times. April 3, 2020.

Miranda, Carolina A. “How a vital record of Mexican indigenous life was created under quarantine”. Los Angeles Times. March 6, 2020.

Soto, Daniel. “A Remarkable Project Remembers Child Migrants Who Died in Custody”. Hyperallergic. March 3, 2020.

2019

Cohen-Aponte, Ananda, and Ella Maria Diaz. “Painting Prophecy: Mapping a Polyphonic Chicana Codex Tradition in the Twenty-First Century”. English Language Notes (2019) 57 (2): 22–42.

Trujillo, Maria. “Sandy Rodriguez: an artist honoring the land and confronting immigration”. Art Critique Magazine. November 10, 2019.

Villaseñor-Black, Charlene. “Art and Migration”. Aztlan: A Journal of Chicano Studies 44, no. 1 (2019): 1–16.

2018

Miranda, Carolina A. "How artist Sandy Rodriguez tells today's fraught immigration story with pre-Columbian painting tools". Los Angeles Times. December 2, 2018.

Quinn, Patrick. “Exploring Boundaries with HERE – A Group Show at LA Municipal Art Gallery”. Art and Cake. December 13, 2018.

References

External links 
 https://www.studiosandyrodriguez.com

American women artists